Hon. Henry Ponsonby (1685 – 11 May 1745) was an Irish soldier.

He was the son of William Ponsonby, 1st Viscount Duncannon and brother of Brabazon Ponsonby, 1st Earl of Bessborough. He married his cousin Lady Frances Brabazon, daughter of Chambré Brabazon, 5th Earl of Meath, and was father of Chambré Brabazon Ponsonby.

He sat in the Irish House of Commons for Fethard from 1715 to 1727. In 1727 he was elected for both Clomines and Inistioge, sitting for the latter constituency until his death.

He reached the rank of Major-General and was colonel of a Regiment of Foot, (later the 37th Regiment of Foot), from 1735 to his death. He was killed at the Battle of Fontenoy in 1745.

References

1685 births
1745 deaths
Irish soldiers in the British Army
Members of the Parliament of Ireland (pre-1801) for County Wexford constituencies
Younger sons of viscounts